Olsi is an Albanian male given name. Notable people with this name include:

 Olsi Baze (born 1977), Albanian politician
  (born 1998), Albanian comedian
 Olsi Gocaj, Albanian football player
 Olsi Krasniqi (born 1992), Albanian rugby league player
 Olsi Rama, Albanian politician
 Olsi Teqja (born 1988), Albanian football player

See also
 Olší (Brno-Country District), Czech Republic
 Olší (Jihlava District), Czech Republic